Critical ethnography applies a critical theory based approach to ethnography. It  focuses on the implicit values expressed within ethnographic studies and, therefore, on the unacknowledged biases that may result from such implicit values. It has been called critical theory in practice. In the spirit of critical theory, this approach seeks to determine symbolic mechanisms, to extract ideology from action, and to understand the cognition and behaviour of research subjects within historical, cultural, and social frameworks.

Critical ethnography incorporates reflexive inquiry into its methodology. Researchers employing this approach position themselves as being intrinsically linked to those being studied and thus inseparable from their context. In addition to speaking on behalf of subjects, critical ethnographers will also attempt to recognize and articulate their own perspective as a means of acknowledging the biases that their own limitations, histories, and institutional standpoints bear on their work. Further, critical ethnography is inherently political as well as pedagogical in its approach. There is no attempt to be purely detached and scientifically objective in reporting and analysis. In contrast to conventional ethnography which describes what is, critical ethnography also asks what could be in order to disrupt tacit power relationships and perceived social inequalities.

History
Critical ethnography stems from both anthropology and the Chicago school of sociology. Following the movements for civil rights of the 1960s and 1970s some ethnographers became more politically active and experimented in various ways to incorporate emancipatory political projects into their research. For example, some ethnographers with political agendas for change chose to conduct fieldwork in unconventional environments such as modern workplaces that were not necessarily considered exotic, as previous anthropologists had typically done. Other ethnographers consciously attempted to conduct research on so-called deviant or suppressed groups from outside the paradigm of hegemonic cultural positionings to provide new avenues for dissent and dialogue on societal transformation.

Notable contributors to critical ethnography

Phil Carspecken
D. Soyini Madison
Geoffrey Walford

See also 
Sociology
Chicago School (sociology)
Anthropology
Ethnomethodology
Qualitative research

References

Suggested reading

Brown, S. G., & Dobrin, S. I. (2004). Ethnography unbound: From theory shock to critical praxis. Albany: State University of New York Press.
Carspecken, P. F. (1996). Critical ethnography in educational research: A theoretical and practical guide. New York: Routledge.
Carucci, Laurence M. & Michèle D. Dominy (2005). Anthropology in the ‘Savage Slot’: Reflections on the Epistemology of Knowledge. Anthropological Forum: A Journal of Social Anthropology and Comparative Sociology, 15 (3). 
Lederman, Rena (2005). Challenging Audiences: Critical Ethnography in/for Oceania.  Anthropological Forum 15 (3), November 2005, pages 319-328 
Noblit, G. W., Flores, S. Y., & Murillo, E. G. (2004). Postcritical ethnography: Reinscribing critique. Cress, NJ: Hampton Press.
Simon, R. I., & Dippo, D. (1986). On critical ethnographic work. Anthropology & Education Quarterly, 17(4), 195-202.
 Young Leslie, H (2005). Tongan Doctors and a Critical Medical Ethnography. Anthropological Forum 15 (3), 277-286.  
Soyini Madison, D. (2005). Critical ethnography: method, ethics, and performance. Thousand Oaks, CA: Sage.
Thomas, J. (1993). Doing critical ethnography. Thousand Oaks, CA: Sage.
Walford, G. (2009). In Carspecken P. F. (Ed.), Critical ethnography and education. Bingley: Emerald Group Publishing.

External links
Special Issue of Anthropological Forum, A Journal of Social Anthropology and Comparative Sociology: Critical Ethnography In The Pacific: Transformations In Pacific Moral Orders 
Professor Phil Carspecken's academic homepage at Indiana University.
Professor D. Soyini Madison's academic homepage at Northwestern University.
Professor Geoffrey Walford's academic homepage at the University of Oxford
Example of a critical ethnographic approach to modern media using longitudinal TV/media appropriation and remixes to ethnographically explicate contemporary North American culture - by Cultural Farming.

Anthropology
Critical theory
Ethnography